Gare d'Onzain is a railway station serving the town Onzain, Loir-et-Cher department, central France. It is situated on the Paris–Bordeaux railway.

Services

The station is served by regional trains (TER Centre-Val de Loire) to Tours, Blois and Orléans.

References

Railway stations in Loir-et-Cher
TER Centre-Val de Loire